Gotfredsen is a surname. Notable people with the surname include:

 Leif Gotfredsen (1934–2006), Canadian rower
 Nicholas Gotfredsen (born 1989), Danish footballer

Danish-language surnames